Sam & Max: The Devil's Playhouse is a graphic adventure video game developed by Telltale Games. It is the third and final season of the Sam & Max episodic series created by Telltale, following Sam & Max Save the World and Sam & Max Beyond Time and Space. The first episode was released as one of the first apps for the iPad on April 2, 2010, and was released for Microsoft Windows, OS X, and the PlayStation 3 (the first Telltale game to appear on that platform) on April 15. A remaster by Skunkape Games is planned for release in 2023.

Gameplay
Sam & Max: The Devil's Playhouse is a series of graphic adventure games, requiring the user to control Sam and Max to specific locations, interacting with the environment, collecting and using objects, and talking to other characters in the game in order to solve puzzles and complete the game. The previous two Sam & Max seasons used a traditional point-and-click interface, which is well-suited for Windows and MacOS users but did not translate well to traditional gamepad controls. The game engine for The Devil's Playhouse has been redesigned to handle both the point-and-click scheme and typical console-based controls for third-person perspective games. On a Windows or MacOS computer, the player has the option of plugging in a gamepad to use this second set of controls. Other aspects, such as inventory management, have also been refined to better suit console players or players not familiar with the adventure game genre. The iPad version of the game features direct touch interaction with the characters, scenery, and inventory.

Whereas in previous episodes Max would follow to wherever the player directed Sam, The Devil's Playhouse gives the player direct control over both characters and the ability to swap between characters. This allows for better differentiation between the two characters and increases the variety of gameplay options. A constant theme through the series was a psychic power that Max gained in each episode, such as the ability to read minds, see glimpses of the future or teleport himself to any telephone for which he knows the number. This aspect played into the separate characters' controls in order to solve the puzzles in the game. The PlayStation 3 version of the game features an additional psychic power not present in the other versions.

Synopsis
The game begins with a Twilight Zone-style narrator who tells to the audience that Sam & Max have come to learn of the "Toys of Power" - seemingly harmless toys that Max is able to use to perform various psychic abilities, such as teleportation and precognition. They first use the toys to stop the alien General Skun-ka'pe from destroying the city, who has come to Earth to seek out the Toys himself, and banish him back to the Penal Zone, an interdimensional prison that he escaped previously to the episode. During this mission, the Freelance Police encounter a cult of Mole Men who have been watching over a mysterious artifact called the Devil's Toybox that has been sitting in the basement of Sam and Max's office for quite some time. By watching some dusty film reels, they learn that their great-grandfathers, Sameth and Maximus, were chosen by the cryptic Mr. Papierwaite to retrieve the Toybox from the Tomb of Sammun-Mak, an ancient Pharaoh. However, when they successfully recovered it, Papierwaite attempted to use Maximus' psychic powers and the Toybox to summon the Elder God, Yog-Soggoth, and bring about the end of the world. Sameth and Maximus managed to stop Mr. Papierwaite by tricking him into saying the summoning words himself and then tasked the Mole Men of the time with watching the Toybox in the basement under their office building, accidentally perishing due to a protection spell on the box.

Just before the last reel is played, Sam goes to the bathroom and returns to find that somebody has stolen Max's brain and the Devil's Toybox. After interrogating several suspects, Sam tracks the brain thief to the Museum of Mostly Natural History, where he temporarily reanimates Max's body by putting the brain of the Pharaoh Sammun-Mak into Max's head. Together, they discover that Skun-ka'pe has escaped the Penal Zone and is fighting the still-living Mr. Papierwaite for possession of the Toybox and Max's brain. Seeing Sam, they form a temporary alliance and plan to use Max's brain to recollect the Toys of Power and energize the Toybox. Investigating the museum, Sam witnesses an exchange between Papierwaite, now the museum curator, and a seemingly invisible being called Dr. Norrington. He also meets the museum security guard, a giant cockroach named Sal. Though Sam is able to break up Skun-ka'pe and Papierwaite's alliance, Sammun-Mak in Max's body activates the Toybox and creates an alternate reality where Sammun-Mak rules over all. Max, who is still a brain inside a jar, Dr. Norrington and the Mole Cultists are the only ones to remember the previous reality. Together, they convince Sam that he must get close to Sammun-Mak and remove his brain from Max's body. After evading both Papierwaite and Skun-ka'pe, Sam removes the mad pharaoh's brain and reality is restored. Sam returns Max's brain to his body, but they find themselves surrounded by an army of Sam clones, who recover the Toybox and begin a search for the remaining toys.

Taking shelter along with the Stinkies and Skun-ka'pe, who is soon abducted by the clones, Sam and Max uncover a mysterious cloning chamber under Stinky's diner, where the mysterious 'Clone Master' is using the clones to gather the remaining toys of power. They begin a search for the Clone Master and soon meet Mr. Papierwaite and Dr. Norrington, revealed to be the elder god Yog-Soggoth. The two explain that they were fused together when Sameth and Maximus disrupted Papierwaite's ritual in the past and the reason they fought for Max was so they could use his power and the Toybox to send Yog-Soggoth back home then destroy the Toybox for the good of everyone. Yog-Soggoth further explains that his race: The Elder Gods lived on earth and caused havoc before the Mole People banished them to the Dark Dimension and the Devil's Toybox was created to contain his childhood toys (The Toys of Power) to distract his grandson, Junior, while the Mole Men banished them both to the dark dimension, and if all the Toys are returned to The Devil's Toybox, Junior will be summoned and bring about the end of the world. Sam and Max learn that Momma Bosco is missing from Boscotech, and after calling her back in a seance, she reveals that she was paid handsomely by the Clone Master to supply the technology. Sam and Max restore her to life using the cloning machine in exchange for her help. Back in Stinky's Diner, Flint Paper is interrogating Stinky over the mysterious underground passages and exchanges between Stinky and her lover 'Mr. S'. Sam and Max help her escape from the Diner and then follow her to a meeting with Mr. S, who is revealed to be Sal. Shortly afterwards, the two fall under the control of the Clone Master but with their indirect help, Sam and Max follow the clones to where the Toybox has been taken. Before they can recover the toy box, they are stopped by Charlie Ho-Tep, an evil ventriloquist dummy and one of the Toys of Power in their possession who reveals himself to be the Clone Master. Sam and Max are captured and taken to the Statue of Liberty, where Charlie Ho-Tep plans to complete the ritual to summon Junior in the hope that he will be played with again. With the help of Dr. Norrington and Papierwaite, Max unleashes his psychic powers so that he no longer needs the Toys to defeat Charlie, tricking him into destroying the Toybox and himself. However, Max accidentally swallows some of the demonic essence left by Junior, causing him to turn into a giant beast.

One week later, Max has been ravaging the city and Sam forms a strike team alongside a heavily pregnant Sybil, Dr. Norrington and Papierwaite, to enter Max's body and reverse the changes. Inside, Sam takes control of Max's giant body with the help of Sal, who dies from heavy radiation poisoning. Sam then meets with the narrator, who reveals himself to be Max's "Super-Ego", telling Sam that he plans to blow up Max's brain and take the city with it due to Max's lack of morals. In order to destroy the tumor (the source of Max's phychic powers that was mutated by Junior's ecense causing Max's mutation) and stop the Super-Ego, Sam recovers the Cthonic Destroyer from the now allied Skun-ka'pe and Girl Stinky with Flint Paper's help, but it is accidentally broken when Sybil goes into labor. Max's subconscious suddenly shows a desire to save Sybil, and the Narrator decides that he has been wrong and that he will save the city rather than destroy it deciding to remove the tumour himself. Sam and the others escape, but the Narrator overworks himself trying to remove the tumour causing Max's head to catch fire (as Momma Bosco had forewarned), then Max is hit by a Maimtron 9000 with a nuke inside it, realizing he is going to die a saddened Max uses the last of his powers to teleport himself on to Skun-ka'pe's ship before he explodes, seemingly killing himself, The Narrator, Girl Stinky, Sammun-Mak's brain (which Skun-ka'pe was using to power his ship) and Skun-ka'pe in the process. Despite Momma Bosco's best efforts, they cannot clone Max and Sam walks off alone. At the last moment, he is greeted by the parallel universe Max (from the previous season, Sam & Max Beyond Time and Space) whose Sam was destroyed under similar circumstances. Together again, the two head off on another adventure.

Episodes

Development
The Devil's Playhouse was the third Sam & Max game produced by Telltale Games since acquiring the license after the cancellation of Sam & Max: Freelance Police in 2004. The game was initially expected to be released in 2009, a year after Sam & Max Beyond Time and Space. Though the game failed to materialize, towards the end of 2009 Telltale alluded to the Sam & Max sequel in the final chapter of Tales of Monkey Island, directing players to the game's preliminary website. Industry media later noted that the title Sam & Max: The Devil's Playhouse as well as the title of the first episode, "The Penal Zone", had been registered with the OFLC, the Australian film and video game classification body. Telltale officially announced The Devil's Playhouse at the Game Developers Conference in March 2010, for release for Windows, the PlayStation Network and Mac OS.

While The Devil's Playhouse was originally announced for PC and the PlayStation 3 for release on April 15, an iPad version of the game became available on April 2, as one of the first applications for the release of the device. Telltale's CEO, Dan Connors, revealed that they chose to develop the series for the iPad as a new opportunity as it "really revolutionizes the way our stuff is played". Connors also stated that once they started testing the iPad version, they felt the device helped to give more immersion to the game, as opposed to the other platforms where they play out more as an interaction movie. Telltale was able to keep most of the features that they had already developed for the PC and console releases, including 3D graphics limited only by the shader technology on the iPad, while including features that took advantage of the iPad's technology, such as a touch-based interface.

Promotions
In April 2010, game developer Valve announced that anyone who purchased The Devil's Playhouse through Steam would receive three bonus items in Team Fortress 2: a hat based on Max's head, Max's pistol, and Sam's revolver. The promotion ended on April 26. This was later expanded to include people who purchased the games through the Telltale store.

References

External links
 Telltale Games Sam and Max website

2010 video games
Episodic video games
IOS games
MacOS games
Nintendo Switch games
PlayStation 3 games
PlayStation Network games
Point-and-click adventure games
Single-player video games
Telltale Games games
Video games about cults
Video games about dogs
Video games about rabbits and hares
Video games about toys
Video games based on Sam & Max
Video games developed in the United States
Video games scored by Jared Emerson-Johnson
Video games set in Egypt
Video games set in New York City
Windows games